The US Open Polo Championship is an annual polo championship in the United States. It is organized since 1904 by the United States Polo Association (USPA).

History

The tournament was first played on September 20, 1904 at Van Cortlandt Park in The Bronx in New York City.

At the first game the Wanderers defeated the Meadowbrook Freebooters.

After the inaugural U.S. Open in 1904, the tournament was not played again until 1910, when it grew to include six teams. It resumed at Narragansett Pier, Rhode Island, where it was played for several years before relocating to what became its longtime home, Meadowbrook Polo Club in Old Westbury, New York.

In 1954, the U.S. Open moved to Oak Brook, Illinois, where it remained for 22 years, followed by an eight-year stint at Retama in San Antonio, Texas.

In the late 1980s and into the 1990s, the tournament circulated among several clubs throughout the United States, including Eldorado, Lexington, Palm Beach and Royal Palm. In 2004, marking one hundred years since the tournament's inception, the U.S. Open Polo Championship relocated to the International Polo Club Palm Beach, where it has been ever since.

Unlike its counterpart the Argentine Open Polo Championship in Argentina, no 40 goal team has ever competed for the U.S. Open Polo Championship. Originally there were no team handicap limits for the U.S. Open, but limits were eventually put in place by the United States Polo Association in the post-WWII era (thereby ending the true "Open" status of the tournament). During most of the post-WWII era the handicap limit per team was 26 goals. In 2019, the United States Polo Association lowered the maximum handicap for the tournament to 22 goals per team in an effort to foster increased tournament participation.

Trophy

The U.S. Open Polo Championship trophy was designed by artist Sally James Farnham. The silver cup features horses and riders in relief around the top perimeter and bottom bowl of the cup with rearing horses rising from the base of the cup.

Statistics

The individual record holder with the most US Open Polo Championships is Guillermo ("Memo") Gracida Jr with 16 total championships.

The individual record holder with the most US Open Polo Championships in a row is Guillermo ("Memo") Gracida Jr with 6 championships in a row (1992 through 1997). The individuals with the second most US Open Polo Championships in a row (four in a row) are Jack Murphy (1964-1967), Ray Harrington Jr. (1966-1969), and Guillermo ("Memo") Gracida Jr (1987-1990).

The two individuals with the greatest length of time between their first victory and their latest victory are Guillermo ("Memo") Gracida Jr (1977 to 2004) and Michael V. ("Mike") Azzaro (1986 to 2013) both with 27 years between first and last wins.

The individual record holder with the most US Open Polo Championship runner-up appearances is Thomas "Tommy" Hitchcock, Jr. with 9 total runner-up appearances.

Only 5 times in history has an identically formed team won the U.S. Open two years in row. Those teams were: Cooperstown (1912 & 1913), Meadow Brook (1919 & 1920), Greentree (1935 & 1936), Old Westbury (1937 & 1938), and Zacara (2012 & 2013). Zacara was the only team to do it in the team-handicap-limit era. No identically formed team has ever won the U.S. Open three years in a row.

The Championship has been won four times by non-U.S. based teams. The foreign winners were: Ranelagh from England (1910), the Argentine Polo Federation team (1922), the Argentine Santa Paula team (1931), and Mexico (1946).

On April 12, 1998, Nic Roldan became the youngest player to ever win the Championship. He was 15 years and 129 days old. On April 18, 2021, Adolfo "Poroto" Cambiaso Jr. became the second youngest player to ever win the Championship. He was 15 years and 143 days old.

There are three players who won the U.S. Open while simultaneously holding office as Chairman of the USPA. They were: Louis E. Stoddard (1927), Elbridge T. Gerry (1940), and William T. Ylvisaker (1972).

Champions

Multiple U.S. Open Polo Championship Winners

Titles by team

Photographs

References

Polo competitions in the United States
1904 establishments in New York City
Recurring sporting events established in 1904